Ratangarh is a town and a nagar parishad in Neemuch district in the Indian state of Madhya Pradesh.

Geography
It has an average elevation of 379 metres (1243 feet).

Demographics

 India census, Ratangarh had a population of 7004. Males constitute 51% of the population and females 49%. Ratangarh has an average literacy rate of 65%, higher than the national average of 59.5%: male literacy is 75%, and female literacy is 55%. In Ratangarh, 15% of the population is under 6 years of age.

References

Cities and towns in Neemuch district
Neemuch

it:Ratangarh